Dermot Patrick Mulroney (born October 31, 1963) is an American actor. He is known for his roles in romantic comedy, western, and drama films. Appearing on screen since 1986, he is known for his work in various films such as Young Guns (1988), Staying Together (1989), Where the Day Takes You (1992), Point of No Return (1993),  Angels in the Outfield (1994), My Best Friend's Wedding (1997), About Schmidt (2002), The Wedding Date (2005), Zodiac (2007), August: Osage County (2013), Insidious: Chapter 3 (2015), and the HBO films The Last Outlaw (1993) and Long Gone (1987). Mulroney played the main antagonist Francis Gibson in NBC's Crisis (2014), Dr. Walter Wallace in Pure Genius (2016–2017), Sean Pierce in Showtime's Shameless (2015–2017) and Bobby Sheridan in USA's The Purge (2018–2019).

Early life
Mulroney was born in Alexandria, Virginia on Halloween Day in 1963. His father Michael Mulroney, from Elkader, Iowa, was a law professor at Villanova University School of Law beginning in the 1990s, prior to which he had a private practice in tax law for thirty years in Washington, D.C. His mother, Ellen, originally from Manchester, Iowa, was a regional theater actress. Mulroney is of Irish and German descent, and is the middle child among five siblings. He has two older brothers, Conor and Sean; a younger brother, Kieran Mulroney, who is an actor and screenwriter; and a younger sister, Moira.
Mulroney attended Matthew Maury Elementary School and played cello in school and city youth orchestras, as well as acted in children's community theater. He finished 9th and 10th grades at George Washington High School, before attending T. C. Williams High School (class of 1981) in Alexandria, Virginia. During his sophomore year in high school, he attended the Interlochen Arts Camp as a cellist. Beginning at age 18, Mulroney studied communications at Northwestern University in Evanston, Illinois, where he was a member of the Phi Gamma Delta fraternity, and graduated in 1985.

Mulroney has a scar on his upper lip from a childhood accident, about which he explained, "I was 3½ and I was carrying a dish for our pet rabbits. And I tripped and it broke, and I fell on it."

Career

1986–1996

In his senior year in college, Mulroney responded to a sign-up sheet and auditioned in front of WMA agent Barbara Gale, who offered him a contract and asked him to relocate to Hollywood. There, Mulroney auditioned for three months before landing the role of the male lead in his debut in Sin of Innocence. In his first decade acting, Mulroney appeared in a slew of drama films often dealing with heavy subject matter: Sin of Innocence (1986), in which he played a stepbrother romantically involved with his stepsister after their parents marry; Daddy (1987), in which he played the boyfriend in a couple struggling with teenage parenthood; the Lee Grant sibling family drama Staying Together (1989); Unconquered (1989), in which he portrayed the son of Richmond Flowers Sr., an opponent of Alabama Governor George Wallace's segregationist policies; Longtime Companion (1989), in which he portrayed the first HIV/AIDS patient to die of the disease in a widely released film; Where the Day Takes You (1992), in which he plays the leader of a group of teenage runaways trying to survive in the streets of Los Angeles; and supporting roles in the Emmy Award-nominated Family Pictures (1993), which dealt with the struggles of raising a child with autism, and Bastard out of Carolina (1996), which dealt with abuse and molestation.

In 1988, Mulroney appeared in the baseball flick Long Gone, for which he was nominated for Best Supporting Actor in a Miniseries or Movie at the CableACE Awards. In 1989, he appeared in Survival Quest, during which he met Catherine Keener. While filming, in  1986, Keener was caught in a river current and floated precariously close to whitewater rapids when Mulroney jumped in and the pair were picked up half a mile downstream. The two eventually married in 1990. The couple would go on to appear together in four other films: Living In Oblivion (1995), Heroine of Hell (1996), Box of Moonlight (1996) and Lovely & Amazing (2001). Mulroney's roles in Samantha (1991) and Where The Day Takes You (1992) awarded him Best Actor at the Seattle International Film Festival.

Mulroney appeared in a number of western films throughout this period, namely Young Guns in 1988, Silent Tongue and The Last Outlaw in 1993, and Bad Girls in 1994. The Sam Shepard-directed Silent Tongue would mark the second in a series of four collaborations, with the two previously appearing together on screen in Bright Angel (1990), for which Mulroney won the Jury Special Prize at the Torino International Festival of Young Cinema. Mulroney co-starred in the comedy-drama films: Staying Together (1989); The Thing Called Love (1993), the second of two collaborations with River Phoenix before his death; and There Goes My Baby (1994), originally filmed in 1990. Mulroney appeared in the thriller films Point of No Return in 1993; Copycat in 1995; the Palme d'Or-nominated Kansas City, and The Trigger Effect  in 1996. He was nominated for Best Kiss, with Winona Ryder, for How to Make an American Quilt (1996) at the MTV Movie Awards.

1997–present

Several of his lead performances have been in romantic comedy films. Mulroney has appeared in many films, including as the male lead in My Best Friend's Wedding alongside Julia Roberts and Cameron Diaz. In 1993 Mulroney played "J.P", the boyfriend of star "Maggie" (played by Bridget Fonda) in Point of No Return. Mulroney also played the love interest of Madeleine Stowe in the western Bad Girls. In 2005, he played a male escort alongside Debra Messing in The Wedding Date, and co-starred in the ensemble film The Family Stone, with Sarah Jessica Parker. He was also in the film Abduction (2011) as Martin Price.

In 2003, Mulroney played Gavin Mitchell on the TV series Friends. He appeared in three episodes of the ninth season, his character briefly dating Rachel. This would mark Mulroney's last on-screen appearance on television for a number of years, later revealing in a May 2007 interview that he had turned down TV series roles in favor of film. In 2007, Mulroney appeared in the fifth season of The Batman as Green Lantern / Hal Jordan.

In 1993, he wrote the song "Someone Else's Used Guitar" for Peter Bogdanovich's The Thing Called Love, in which he also starred. Mulroney also had a cameo in the Joaquin Phoenix–directed video "Tired of Being Sorry" for Balthazar Getty's band Ringside. In 2012, Mulroney played the love interest of Zooey Deschanel, Russell, in the Fox series New Girl. In 2013, he played the title starring role in the psychotronic horror film The Rambler, which premiered at the 2013 Sundance Film Festival. He also starred alongside Lin Shaye, Angus Sampson, and Stefanie Scott in the 2015 horror sequel Insidious: Chapter 3. He is the narrator of Legends & Lies (2015-2016) executive produced by Bill O'Reilly for Fox News Channel. He also appeared in the hit Showtime series Shameless as Sean, a recovering drug addict who runs a restaurant.

Personal life

Mulroney married actress Catherine Keener in 1990 after they met in 1986 when filming Survival Quest. They have a son named Clyde Keener Mulroney (born June 21, 1999) who is a singer. The couple separated in May 2005 and Mulroney filed for divorce on June 11, 2007, citing irreconcilable differences. Their divorce became final on December 19, 2007. He later married Italian Tharita Cesaroni in 2008. They have two daughters, and the family lives in Los Angeles.

Mulroney is an accomplished cellist. In 1996, he was part of a band called the Low and Sweet Orchestra that released an album in 1996, "Goodbye to All That". In 2005 he appeared alongside Boyd Tinsley for Alanis Morissette's show at the House of Blues in Hollywood. He played the cello in the films The Thing Called Love, where he portrayed an aspiring country singer; Daddy and Samantha, where he portrayed a college student studying music. He played cello in the song "Place Your Hand" from Melissa Etheridge's 1992 album Never Enough, on the EP for Rain Phoenix's band Papercranes, and on the scores for Mission: Impossible III (2006), Mission: Impossible – Ghost Protocol (2011), and Star Trek Into Darkness (2013). In 2016 his band, Cranky George, released its debut album Fat Lot of Good. Most recently, he portrayed a cello soloist in the second and third seasons of Mozart in the Jungle.

Mulroney was included in People's Sexiest Men of the Year issue in 2005 as its "Sexiest Jack of Arts".

Filmography

Film

Television

Awards and nominations

References

External links 
 
 

20th-century American male actors
21st-century American male actors
1963 births
American cellists
American male film actors
American male television actors
American people of German descent
Association footballers not categorized by position
Association football players not categorized by nationality
Hollywood United players
Living people
Male actors from Alexandria, Virginia
Northwestern University School of Communication alumni
T. C. Williams High School alumni